The Gosport Sand is a geologic formation in Georgia, Alabama, and Mississippi. It preserves fossils dating back to the Paleogene period.

See also

 List of fossiliferous stratigraphic units in Georgia (U.S. state)
 Paleontology in Georgia (U.S. state)

References

 

Paleogene Georgia (U.S. state)
Paleogene Alabama